The 1874–75 season was the second season of competitive football by 3rd Lanark RV.

During the club's early years, the team would play in red shirts and blue shorts. Their traditional white shorts weren't introduced until 1876.

Scottish Cup

3rd Lanark RV entered the Scottish Cup for the second time but were eliminated in the quarter-finals by Dumbarton

References

1874–75
Third Lanark
1874–75 in Scottish football